Pekka Sakari Lagerblom (born 19 October 1982) is a Finnish former professional footballer who played as a midfielder. Notably, he won the German double of Bundesliga and DFB-Pokal with Werder Bremen in 2004.

Club career

FC Lahti
Born in Lahti, Lagerblom started his career at home-town club FC Lahti in Finland's Veikkausliiga. During seasons 2003 and 2004 he represented the team in 55 matches and scored 13 goals.

Germany
In January 2004, Lagerblom moved to Werder Bremen, and won the Bundesliga and German Cup double with the club the same spring. However, he made only 14 appearances in Bremen's first team and was not able to find a regular spot. He spent the spring of 2005 on loan at 1. FC Nürnberg.

In the summer of 2006, he decided to move to 1. FC Köln in search of more first team football. He gained 27 appearances in the team and scored one goal.

In summer 2007, he went to Alemannia Aachen. Between years 2007 and 2009 he represented the team in 40 matches.

In June 2009, Lagerblom left Aachen and signed a one-year contract with FSV Frankfurt. He played in 13 matches during the season.

In July 2010, Lagerblom moved to VfB Stuttgart II where he made 30 appearances in season 2010–11.

One year later he signed for RB Leipzig. He left the team after making only seven caps for the team.

Later years
On 20 February 2013, it was announced that Lagerblom would be joining Veikkausliiga team IFK Mariehamn.

On 21 December 2013, it was announced that Lagerblom would be joining Norwegian side Hamarkameratene signing a three-year contract. In July 2014, it was announced that he would leave the team.

In July 2014, it was announced that Lagerblom joined Swedish side division 4 club Ånge IF. He was injured in his debut versus Hudiksvalls FF.

In January 2015, FC Lahti announced the signing of Lagerblom for the 2015 Veikkausliiga season.

In July 2018, he joined Ykkönen side FC Haka.

In early 2019, he joined hometown club FC Lahti for the third time in his career.

In September 2019, Lagerblom announced his retirement as a player.

International career
Lagerblom made his debut for the Finland national team on 16 November 2003 against Honduras. Lagerblom is not a regular member, he is often a substitute member of the Finland squad.

Personal life
Lagerblom married Anna-Maria (née Lewe), the younger sister of German pop singer Sarah Connor, in January 2005. The couple separated in 2009, while she had a new relationship with footballer Mesut Özil.

His older brother Lasse is also a former footballer.

Career statistics

International

Honours
Werder Bremen
Bundesliga: 2003–04
DFB-Pokal: 2003–04

References

External links
 
 
 

1982 births
Living people
Sportspeople from Lahti
Finnish footballers
Finland international footballers
Association football midfielders
Veikkausliiga players
Bundesliga players
2. Bundesliga players
3. Liga players
Ånge IF players
FC Lahti players
SV Werder Bremen players
SV Werder Bremen II players
1. FC Nürnberg players
1. FC Köln players
Alemannia Aachen players
FSV Frankfurt players
VfB Stuttgart II players
RB Leipzig players
IFK Mariehamn players
Jacksonville Armada FC players
Åtvidabergs FF players
FC Haka players
Finnish expatriate footballers
Finnish expatriate sportspeople in Sweden
Expatriate footballers in Sweden
Finnish expatriate sportspeople in Germany
Expatriate footballers in Germany
Finnish expatriate sportspeople in Norway
Expatriate footballers in Norway
Finnish expatriate sportspeople in the United States
Expatriate soccer players in the United States